The European Tournament for Dancing Students or ETDS is a recurring tournament for ballroom and Latin-American dancing for students from Europe.

Introduction 
The tournament is held twice a year, once during the Pentecost weekend and once in autumn. The event always starts on a Friday  evening and ends on the following Monday morning. Although each ETDS is organised by a different party, the structure remains fairly constant: on Friday evening, the blind date program takes place, in which dancers without a partner can try to find someone with which to compete in one or both dance disciplines. Blind dating is also a motivation for some dancers that want to meet new people. On Saturday, the ballroom tournament for the breitensport class (German, meaning amateur sports for the masses) takes place and the Latin-American tournament for the open class as well as, if so chosen by the organising party, for the CloseD class. On Sunday, all classes dance the respective other discipline. The event ends on Monday with a last common breakfast.

The organisation of each tournament is in the hands of a different participating university. The tournament takes place in the city of the organising university, the location changing every half year to another European city. So far, the tournament has taken place most of the times either in Germany or the Netherlands. In autumn 2015, the ETDS took place in Czech Republic, breaking that series for the first time. With the participation of some students from South Africa, it also premiered hosting dancers from outside Europe.

Although the primary focus of the ETDS lies in organising a tournament of high standards, the event equally aims at creating a social happening where dancers from all of Europe can meet each other. This is encouraged by the possibility to blind date and by a themed festival ("motto party") on the event's Saturday evening and a gala ball on Sunday evening.

The sleeping accommodation is commonly a local gym.

History 
The ETDS was founded by the university dance teams of Clausthal, Braunschweig and Kiel, who agreed to get to know each other during a tournament. The event was organised by these three German universities for a number of times. There was not a regular structure, but the tournament was organised ad hoc. Finding a sleeping accommodation was easy, as the number of participants was still very low.

In November 1990, a tournament prize was introduced that has been used ever since, “der tanzmaus” (German for “the dance mouse”), a pluche mouse. The tanzmaus was a donation of the university of Kiel; Clausthal was the first university to win the mouse. It is given to the winning university which "hosts" the prize until the next ETDS.

In December 1991, a tournament during Sinterklaas took place. The tournament gained more participants and Berlin started participating as well. Berlin won the dance mouse during this Sinterklaas tournament, and promised to organise the event somewhere in the future. During this tournament, only one class existed.

In April 1992, the tournament took place in Clausthal. This was the first tournament in which the team of Dortmund started participating. Some tournaments later, Ulm and Marburg started participating as well.

The University of Berlin fulfilled their promise in 1993 by taking care of the organisation of the tournament. The tournament still did not have separate classes.

The next tournament took place in the spring of 1994, and the tournament gained in popularity; fifteen universities from Germany participated. Also, for the first time, universities from the Netherlands started to participate. The new universities were from Mainz, Geisenheim, Kaiserslautern, Delft and Eindhoven.

During autumn of 1994, the number of participants had increased to such a high amount that problems started to arise between the organisation and the administration of Kiel. The result was that Kiel was disallowed to organise the event for five years.

The next tournament took place in the spring of 1995, and for the first time, the tournament was separated into two classes. They were called “amateurs” and “profis” ("professionals"). Leipzig also joined this tournament.

The tournament that was held in the summer of 1995 was the first event to take place in the Netherlands. The organisation was in the hands of ESDV Footloose from Eindhoven. Groningen joined during this tournament. From now on, the ETDS was no longer organised on an ad hoc basis, but was organised regularly twice each year, during Pentecost and in the autumn, each time by a different university.

The number of participants continued to grow, and around 2004 a third class, "masters", was added to the breitensport section. More than 500 participants took part in the 41st tournament in Groningen in May 2009, and another breitensport class by the name of “champions” was introduced.

The event continued to grow in popularity, and 570 participants were competing in the 47th edition during Pentecost, May 2012. In October 2015, the event was held for the first time in the Czech Republic, in the city of Brno. This was the first ETDS not organised in Germany or the Netherlands.

Rules 
Every ETDS organisation is allowed to make their own rules for the tournament. Each organisation describes rules about clothing and the calculation of the tanzmaus evaluation. Because the focus of each organization may be different, the balance between social orientation and competition changes slightly. Nevertheless, several rules exist during each tournament:

Structure 
Dancers can sign up for two disciplines, standard and Latin-American.

In the breitensport class, only untrained and low level training dancers are allowed. Professional dancers, i.e. those who have reached a higher class in official tournaments held by dance associations, are excluded from the breitensport tournaments. They instead dance in the open class which ranges at least from B to S class dancers.

Some hosting universities decide to provide another separate tournament for a class called CloseD, which consists of dancers of the official D and C classes (varying between national dance associations). In case a separate tournament for this class is chosen not to be held, the organising team will classify the concerning dancers into either breitensport (D class) or open class (C class).

Participants that belong to a dance formation may also be required to dance in the CloseD or open class, depending on the league in which their formation is classified.

In the breitensport section, a pre-qualification round takes place, where each participating couple is classified into the amateur, professional ("profi"), master or the optional champion class, so that each couple will dance the subsequent actual tournament in a class that matches their levels. These tournaments follow the rules of official dancing tournaments. During the finals, open adjudication is sometimes performed, with each adjudicator showing their ranking of the couples on the floor immediately after each dance. However, closed adjudication is often chosen in order to save time. There are winner's certificates and medals for all participants in the finals as well as trophies (instead of medals) for the podium finishers.

Dances
In the respective disciplines, the following dances have to be performed (example rule set):
 Breitensport: ballroom preliminary round: slow waltz, tango, quickstep, from the semi-final of masters and champions additionally: Viennese waltz and/or slowfox; Latin preliminary round: cha-cha-cha, rumba, jive, from the semi-final of masters and champions additionally: samba, paso doble
 CloseD: similar to breitensport, but with a re-dance round for those who didn't directly qualify for the next round
 Open class: similar to CloseD
The ETDS has also seen separate competitions without class separation in Discofox, Salsa and Polka.

Adjudication 
The adjudicators are chosen from volunteers of the participating universities that do not compete themselves in the discipline in which they judge. Adjudicators are selected by their adjudicator's license, by their experience and/or by their level of dancing in regular dance competitions.

Blind dating 
A blind date couple consists of two dancers from different universities. Blind dating is mandatory in the CloseD and open classes (in the latter case sometimes being replaced by composing couples by the lot or by other rules), and stimulated in the breitensport by a blind date programme on Friday and Saturday for the following day's tournament. During the breitensport tournaments, a blind date couple can score more points for a university, and thereby improve their team's chance of winning the tanzmaus prize.

Participants 
Every member of a student dancing society or university student can participate. Each couple dances under the flag of his or her university or dance society. Staff members of the university or dancing society are also allowed to participate. When universities have too few participants to compete for the tanzmaus, they can team up with other universities to improve their chances.

Nationalities 
Every European university or student dance society can participate. In practice, a majority of the participants is German. The second largest participating party is from the Netherlands, and some dancers from the United Kingdom, Switzerland, Estonia, Norway and other neighbouring countries participate as well.

The record for the most teams participating in an ETDS was set at 54th ETDS Brno, where 37 teams from 11 countries took part. This was the first participation for the teams from Crimea/Ukraine, Lublin/Poland, Winterthur/Switzerland and Cape Town/South Africa.

Germany 
From Germany, universities from the following cities have been participating in the ETDS:

 Aachen
 Berlin
 Bielefeld
 Bonn
 Braunschweig
 Clausthal
 Cottbus
 Darmstadt
 Dortmund
 Düsseldorf
 Erlangen
 Frankfurt
 Geisenheim
 Gießen
 Göttingen
 Hannover
 Hildesheim
 Kaiserslautern
 Karlsruhe
 Kehl
 Kiel
 Leipzig
 Mainz
 Marburg
 München
 Münster
 Stuttgart
 Ulm

The Netherlands 
In the Netherlands, the participants often dance under the flag of a dancing society, unlike in Germany, where participants dance under the flag of their university. From the Netherlands, the following cities have been participating in the ETDS:

 Amsterdam (dancing society S.D.V. AmsterDance)
 Delft (dancing society D.S.D.A. Blue Suede Shoes)
 Eindhoven (dancing society E.S.D.V. Footloose)
 Enschede (dancing society D.S.V. 4 Happy Feet)
 Groningen (dancing society  SSV The Blue Toes)
 Leiden (dancing society S.D.A. Leidance)
 Maastricht (dancing society M.S.D.V. Let's Dance)
 Nijmegen (dancing society S.D.V.N. Dance Fever)
 Rotterdam (dancing society Erasmus Dance Society)
 Utrecht (dancing society U.S.D.V. U Dance)
 Wageningen (dancing society WuBDA)

Other European countries

Czech Republic 
 Brno

Estonia 
 Tallinn

France 
 Antibes

Great Britain 
 Cambridge
 Hull
 Liverpool

Norway 
 Oslo
 Trondheim

Poland 
 Lublin

Ukraine 
 Crimea

Switzerland 
 Winterthur
 Zürich

Hungary 
 Budapest

Nations outside Europe 
 Cape Town

List of all tournaments 

 01. Universitäten-Breitensport-Tanzturnier, Braunschweig, 1989
 02. Universitäten-Breitensport-Tanzturnier, Kiel, November 1990
 03. Universitäten-Breitensport-Tanzturnier, Clausthal-Zellerfeld, May 1991
 04. Universitäten-Breitensport-Tanzturnier, Kiel, 6 December 1991
 05. Universitäten-Breitensport-Tanzturnier, Clausthal-Zellerfeld, April 1992
 09. Universitäten-Breitensport-Tanzturnier, Berlin, Pentecost 1993
 10. Universitäten-Breitensport-Tanzturnier, Aachen, autumn 1993
 11. Universitäten-Breitensport-Tanzturnier, Ulm, Pentecost 1994
 12. Universitäten-Breitensport-Tanzturnier, Kiel, autumn 1994
 13. Universitäten-Breitensport-Tanzturnier, Dortmund, Pentecost 1995
 14. Internationales Uni-Tanzturnier, Eindhoven, autumn 1995
 15. Internationales Uni-Tanzturnier, Berlin, Pentecost 1996
 16. Internationales Uni-Tanzturnier, Clausthal-Zellerfeld, autumn 1996
 17. Internationales Uni-Tanzturnier, Aachen, Pentecost 1997
 18. Internationales Uni-Tanzturnier, Eindhoven, autumn 1997
 19. Internationales Uni-Tanzturnier, Groningen, Pentecost 1998
 20. Internationales Uni-Tanzturnier, Berlin, 16 October 1998
 21. Internationales Uni-Tanzturnier, Kiel, 21 May 1999
 22. Internationales Uni-Tanzturnier, Clausthal-Zellerfeldt, 5 November 1999
 23. Internationales Uni-Tanzturnier, Dortmund, 9 June 2000
 24. Internationales Uni-Tanzturnier, Ulm, 27 October 2000
 25. Internationales Uni-Tanzturnier, Aachen, 1 June 2001
 26. Internationales Uni-Tanzturnier, Groningen, 19 October 2001
 27th ETDS Eindhoven, 17 May 2002
 28th ETDS Berlin, 11 October 2002
 29th ETDS Kiel, 6 June 2003
 30th ETDS Clausthal-Zellerfeld, 17 October 2003
 31st ETDS Wuppertal, 28 May 2004
 32nd ETDS Valkenswaard, 22 October 2004
 33rd ETDS Enschede, 13 May 2005
 34th ETDS autumn, 7 October 2005 in Aachen (Motto: Red)
 35th ETDS Pentecost, 2 June 2006 in Clausthal (Motto: Under the Sea)
 36th ETDS autumn, 27 October 2006 in Eindhoven (Motto: Thunder and Lightning)
 37th ETDS Pentecost, 25 May 2007 in Berlin (Motto: Bad Taste)
 38th ETDS autumn, 5 October 2007 in Dortmund (Motto: Dancing in the 80s)
 39th ETDS Pentecost, 9 May 2008 in Kiel (Motto: Aufgetakelt)
 40th ETDS autumn, 10 October 2008 in Kaiserslautern (Motto: Hollywood)
 41st ETDS Pentecost, 29 May 2009 in Groningen (Motto: once upon a time)
 42nd ETDS autumn, 16 October 2009 in Kaiserslautern (Motto: Winterwonderland)
 43rd ETDS Pentecost, 21 May 2010 in Aachen (Motto: Pyjamaparty)
 44th ETDS autumn, 8 October 2010 in Kiel (Motto: ohne Mottoparty)
 45th ETDS Pentecost, 10 June 2011 in Eindhoven (Motto: Come Fly With Us)
 46th ETDS autumn, 7 October 2011 in Kaiserslautern (Motto: Carnival of Venice)
 47th ETDS Pentecost, 25 May 2012 in Enschede (Region Twente) (Motto: Game On)
 48th ETDS autumn, 5 October 2012 in Nijmegen (Motto: Arabian Nights)
 49th ETDS Pentecost, 17 May 2013 in Enschede (Region Twente) (Motto: Fant'ASIA)
 50th ETDS autumn, 11 October 2013 in Clausthal (Motto: Walpurgis)
 51st ETDS Pentecost, 6 June 2014 in Kiel (Motto: dancing submarine)
 52nd ETDS autumn, 10 October 2014 in Monheim am Rhein | Düsseldorf (Motto: Space)
 53rd ETDS Pentecost, 23 May 2015 in Kaiserslautern (Motto: Beach Party)
 54th ETDS autumn, 9 October 2015 in Brno/Czech Republic (Motto: Dancing Zoo)
 55th ETDS Pentecost, 14. May 2016 in Berlin (Motto: Die goldenen Zwanziger)
 56th ETDS autumn, 14 October 2016 in Utrecht (Motto: HighSchool)
 57th ETDS Pentecost, 2 June 2017 in Aachen (Motto: Rock'n'Roll)
 58th ETDS autumn, 6 October 2017 in Kaiserslautern (Motto: KISS:keep it small and simple)
 59th ETDS Pentecost, 18 May 2018 in Kiel (Motto: Te-Kiel-A)
 60th ETDS autumn, 12 October 2018 in Brno/Czech Republic (Motto: MovieNight) 
 61st ETDS Pentecost, 7 June 2019 organized by Clausthal-Zellerfeld, took place in Seesen (Motto: Magic Forrest)
 62nd ETDS autumn, 11 October 2019 in Groningen (Motto: The Dancing Dead)
 63rd ETDS Pentecost, 3 June 2022 in Enschede (Motto: Saturday Morning Cartoons)

Future tournaments 

 63rd ETDS Pentecost 2020 in Amsterdam (Motto: The Blacklight District)Cancelled due to the COVID-19 pandemic.
 64th ETDS autumn 2020 in Delft (Motto: ETDS 3030: Festival of the Future)Postponed at first to autumn 2021, later to autumn 2022.

References

External links 
 http://www.etds.eu/ - Website of the most recent organisation

Dance competitions
Dance in Europe
Student sports competitions